Soil steam sterilization (soil steaming) is a farming technique that sterilizes soil with steam in open fields or greenhouses. Pests of plant cultures such as weeds, bacteria, fungi and viruses are killed through induced hot steam which causes vital cellular proteins to  unfold. Biologically, the method is considered a partial disinfection. Important heat-resistant, spore-forming bacteria can survive and revitalize the soil after cooling down. Soil fatigue can be cured through the release of nutritive substances blocked within the soil. Steaming leads to a better starting position, quicker growth and strengthened resistance against plant disease and pests. Today, the application of hot steam is considered the best and most effective way to disinfect sick soil, potting soil and compost. 
It is being used as an alternative to bromomethane, whose production and use was curtailed by the Montreal Protocol. "Steam effectively kills pathogens by heating the soil to levels that cause protein coagulation or enzyme inactivation."

Benefits of soil steaming
Soil sterilization provides secure and quick relief of soils from substances and organisms harmful to plants such as:
 Bacteria
 Viruses
 Fungi
 Nematodes
 Other pests

Further positive effects are:

 All weeds and weed seeds are killed
 Significant increase of crop yields 
 Relief from soil fatigue through activation of chemical – biological reactions
 Blocked nutritive substances in the soil are tapped and made available for plants
 Alternative to methyl bromide and other critical chemicals in agriculture

Steaming with superheated steam
Through modern steaming methods with superheated steam at 180–200 °C, an optimal soil disinfection can be achieved. Soil only absorbs a small amount of humidity. Micro organisms become active once the soil has cooled down. This creates an optimal environment for instant tillage with seedlings and seeds. 
Additionally the method of integrated steaming can promote a target-oriented resettlement of steamed soil with beneficial organisms. In the process, the soil is first freed from all organisms and then revitalized and microbiologically buffered through the injection of a soil activator based on compost which contains a natural mixture of favorable microorganisms (e.g. Bacillus subtilis, etc.).

Different types of such steam application are also available in practice, including substrate steaming, surface steaming, and deep soil steaming.

Surface steaming
Several methods for surface steaming are in use amongst which are: area sheet steaming, the steaming hood, the steaming harrow, the steaming plough and vacuum steaming with drainage pipes or mobile pipe systems.

In order to pick the most suitable steaming method, certain factors have to be considered such as soil structure, plant culture and area performance. At present, more advanced methods are being developed, such as sandwich steaming or partially integrated sandwich steaming in order to minimize energy consumption and associated costs as much as possible.

Deep soil steaming
Deep soil steaming is a concept adopted by the Norwegian company Soil Steam international AS. They have developed a technology that gets the steam down to 30 cm deep in the soil. This is done in a continuous process and their last prototype managed to treat 1 hectare in 20 hours. When steaming the soil this deep, they get deep enough to prevent fall plowing from bringing up new seeds, fungi or nematodes. This means that the soil stays free from weeds, seeds, fungi and nematodes for many years after one deep soil steam operation.

Sheet steaming

Surface steaming with special sheets (sheet steaming) is a method which has been established for decades in order to steam large areas reaching from 15 to 400 m2 in one step. If properly applied, sheet steaming is simple and highly economic. The usage of heat resistant, non-decomposing insulation fleece saves up to 50% energy, reduces the steaming time significantly and improves penetration. Single working step areas up to 400 m2 can be steamed in 4–5 hours down to 25–30 cm depth / 90 °C. 
The usage of heat resistant and non-decomposing synthetic insulation fleece, 5 mm thick, 500 gr / m2, can reduce steaming time by about 30%. Through a steam injector or a perforated pipe, steam is injected underneath the sheet after it has been laid out and weighted with sand sacks.

The area performance in one working step depends on the capacity of the steam generator (e.g. steam boiler):

The steaming time depends on soil structure as well as outside temperature and amounts to 1–1.5 hours per 10 cm steaming depth. Hereby the soil reaches a temperature of about 85 °C. Milling for soil loosening is not recommended since soil structure may become too fine which reduces its penetrability for steam. The usage of spading machines is ideal for soil loosening. The best results can be achieved if the soil is cloddy at greater depth and granulated at lesser depth.

In practice, working with at least two sheets simultaneously has proven to be highly effective. While one sheet is used for steaming the other one is prepared for steam injection, therefore unnecessary steaming recesses are avoided.

Depth steaming with vacuum
Steaming with vacuum which is induced through a mobile or fixed installed pipe system in the depth of the area to be steamed, is the method that reaches the best penetration. Despite high capital cost, the fixed installation of drainage systems is reasonable for intensively used areas  since steaming depths of up to 80 cm can be achieved.

In contrast to fixed installed drainage systems, pipes in mobile suction systems are on the surface. A central suction pipeline consisting of zinc-coated, fast-coupling pipes are connected in a regular spacing of 1.50 m and the ends of the hoses are pushed into the soil to the desired depth with a special tool.

The steaming area is covered with a special steaming sheet and weighted all around as with sheet steaming. The steam is injected underneath the sheet through an injector and protection tunnel. While with short areas up to 30 m length steam is frontally injected, with longer areas steam is induced in the middle of the sheet using a T-connection branching out to both sides. 
As soon as the sheet is inflated to approximately 1 m by the steam pressure, the suction turbine is switched on.  First, the air in the soil is removed via the suction hoses. A partial vacuum is formed and the steam is pulled downward.
 
During the final phase, when the required steaming depth has been reached, the ventilator runs non-stop and surplus steam is blown out. To ensure that this surplus steam is not lost, it is fed back under the sheet.
     
As with all other steaming systems, a post-steaming period of approximately 20–30 minutes is required. Steaming time is approximately 1 hour per 10 cm steaming depth.  The steam requirement is approximately 7–8 kg/m2.
    
The most important requirement, as with all steaming systems, is that the soil is well loosened before steaming, to ensure optimal penetration.

Negative pressure technique
Negative pressure technique generates appropriate soil temperature at a 60 cm depth and complete control of nematodes, fungi and weeds is achieved. In this technique, the steam is introduced under the steaming sheath and forced to enter the soil profile by a negative pressure. The negative pressure is created by a fan that sucks the air out of the soil through buried perforated polypropylene pipes. This system requires a permanent installation of perforated pipes into the soil, at a depth of at least 60 cm to be protected from plough.

Steaming with hoods

A steaming hood is a mobile device consisting of corrosion-resistant materials such as aluminum, which is put down onto the area to be steamed. In contrast to sheet steaming, cost-intensive working steps such as laying out and weighting the sheets don't occur, however the area steamed per working step is smaller in accordance to the size of the hood.

Outdoors, a hood is positioned either manually or via tractor with a special pre-stressed 4 point suspension arm. Steaming time amounts to 30 min for a penetration down to 25 cm depth. Hereby a temperature of 90 °C can be reached. In large stable glasshouses, the hoods are attached to tracks. They are lifted and moved by pneumatic cylinders. Small and medium-sized hoods up to 12 m2 are lifted manually using a tipping lever or moved electrically with special winches.

Combined surface and depth injection of steam (Sandwich Steaming)

Sandwich steaming, which was developed in a project among DEIAFA, University of Turin (Italy, www.deiafa.unito.it) and Ferrari Costruzioni Meccaniche (see image), represents a combination of depth and surface steaming, offers an efficient method to induce hot steam into the soil. The steam is simultaneously pushed into the soil from the surface and from the depth. For this purpose, the area, which must be equipped with a deep steaming injection system, is covered with a steaming hood. The steam enters the soil from the top and the bottom at the same time. Sheets are not suitable, since a high pressure up to 30 mm water column arises underneath the cover.

Sandwich steaming offers several advantages. On the one hand, application of energy can be increased to up to 120 kg steam per m2/h. In comparison to other steaming methods up to 30% energy savings can be achieved and the usage of fuel (e.g. heating oil) accordingly decreases. The increased application of energy leads to a quick heating of the soil which reduces the loss of heat. On the other hand, only half of the regular steaming time is needed.

Comparison of sandwich steaming with other steam injection methods relating to steam output and energy demand(*):

(*) in soil max 30% moisture

Clearly, Sandwich steaming reaches the highest steam output at the lowest energy demand.

Partially integrated sandwich steaming
The partial integrated sandwich steaming is an advanced combined method for steaming merely the areas which shall be planted and purposely leaving out those areas which shall not be used. In order to avoid risk of re-infection of steamed areas with pest from unsteamed areas, beneficial organisms can directly be injected into the hygenized soil via a soil activator (e.g. special compost). The partial sandwich steaming unlocks further potential savings in the steaming process.

Container / Stack steaming
Stack steaming is used when thermically treating compost and substrates such as turf. Depending on the amount, the material to be steamed is piled up to 70 cm height in steaming boxes or in small dump trailers. Steam is evenly injected via manifolds. For huge amounts, steaming containers and soil boxes are used which are equipped with suction systems to improve steaming results. Midget amounts can be steamed in special small steaming devices.

The amount of soil steamed should be tuned in a way that steaming time amounts to at most 1.5 h in order to avoid large quantities of condensed water in the bottom layers of the soil.

In light substrates, such as turf, the performance per hour is significantly higher.

History
Modern soil steam sterilization was first discovered in 1888 (by Frank in Germany) and was first commercially used in the United States (by Rudd) in 1893 (Baker 1962). Since then, a wide variety of steam machines have been built to disinfest both commercial greenhouse and nursery field soils (Grossman and Liebman 1995). In the 1950s, for example, steam sterilization technologies expanded from disinfestation of potting soil and greenhouse mixes to commercial production of steam rakes and tractor-drawn steam blades for fumigating small acres of cut flowers and other high-value field crops (Langedijk 1959). Today, even more effective steam technologies are being developed.

Application of hot steam 
 In horticulture as well as nurseries for sterilization of substrates and top soil
 In agriculture for sterilization and treatment of food waste for pig fattening and heating of molasses
 In mushroom cultivation for pasteurization of  growing rooms, sterilization of top soil and combined application as heating
 In wineries as combination boiler for sterilization and cleaning of storage tanks, tempering of mash and for warm water generation.

References

Further reading
  (1997): STEAM - The Hottest Alternative to Methyl Bromide.  American Nurseryman, August 15, 1997, 37–43
  (1995): Agricultiural Production Without Methyl Bromide - Four Case Studies; CSIRO Division of Entomology and UNEP IE's OzonAction Programme under the Multilateral Fund, 1995
  (1993): Steaming is still the most effective way of treating contaminated media. Greenhouse Manager 1993, 110(10), 88–89
  (1992): Beneficial fungus increases yields, profits in commercial production. Greenhouse Manager 1992, 10, 105
  (2008): Introduction to Soil Steaming
  (1962): Principles of heat treatment of soil and planting material. J. Austral. Inst. Of Agric. Sci. 1962, 28(2),  118–126
  (1954): Steampressure in soil sterilisation I. In bins. The Journal of horticultural Science 1954 /29, 89–97
  (1955): Steampressure in soil sterilisation II. Glasshouse in situ sterilising. Journal of horticultural Science 1955 /1, 43–55
  (2003): Modeling and control of steam soil disinfestation processes. Biosystems Engineering,  84, 3,  247–256, 
  (1964): Temperature distribution and performance in balloon soil steaming. Hort. Res. 4 1964 /1, 27–41
  (1960): Investigations of the technique of soil steaming. Acta Agriculturae Skandinavica Supplementum 9, Stockholm
  (1946): Soil steaming for disease control. Soil Science 61, 83–92
  (1947): Studies on stam sterilisation of soils I. Some effects on physical, chemical and biological properties. Canadian Journal of Research, C, 25, 189–208
  (1957): The use of steam for soil sterilisation. I. Physical aspects of soil sterilisation - II. Practical aspects of soil sterilisation - III. Selection of boiler, steam mains and distribution systems. Industrial Heating Engineer 19, 3–6, 24, 38–41, 67–71
  (1957): Some experiments on the steam sterilising of soil. I. Passage of heat through fine soil - II. Heating of clods of soil. Journal of Agricultural Engineering Research 2, 4, 262
  (1959): Some experiments on steam sterilising of soil. III. The passage of heat downwards below the point of injection. Journal of Agricultural Engineering Research 4, 153–160
  (1959): Some experiments on steam sterilising of soil. IV. The effect of covering the soil surface. Journal of Agricultural Engineering Research 4, 153–160
  (1955): Desinfection of soil by heat, flooding and fumagation. Botanical Review 21, 189–250
  (1957): Heat treatment of soil, ed. The UC System for producing healthy container-grown plants.  University of California, Division of Agricultural Sciences, Oakland, CA

External links 
 Soil Steaming and Steam Boiler Blog

Boilers
Organic food
Soil science
Steam power